Tel Zayit is an archaeological tell in the Shephelah, or lowlands, of Israel, about 30 km east of Ashkelon.

History
The city was destroyed by fire twice, in 1200 BCE and the ninth century BCE. Hazael of Aram may have been the military leader who ordered the destruction of the city in the ninth century BCE. The Arameans' siege tactics are known from the Zakkur stele, which records that Hazael's son, called Ben-Hadad, employed spectacular siege warfare against his enemies. The Hebrew Bible records that Hazael devastated cities in the Shephelah during the ninth century BCE, including the Philistine city of Gath. The similar siege and destruction in 9th century BCE of Tell es-Safi, a nearby site usually identified as Gath, has been cited by archaeologists as possible evidence of Hazael's campaign.

From at least the 16th century until some time during the 20th century, the site was occupied by the Arab village Zayta. During the period of the British mandate, the village moved 1.5 km to the north. It was depopulated in 1948.

Work at Tel Zayit began with a preliminary survey in 1998 by a Pittsburgh Theological Seminary team led by Ron Tappy.

During the 2005 season, archaeologists discovered the Zayit Stone among the ruins of a fire dating to the tenth century BC. Alternatively, a 9th century BC date has been suggested. 

The stone includes an inscription identified by some scholars as an abecedary, among the oldest ever discovered.

See also
Archaeology of Israel
Biblical archaeology
Cities of the ancient Near East
Tel Burna
Zakkur

References

Further reading
Ron E. Tappy and P. Kyle McCarter, Literate Culture and Tenth-century Canaan: The Tel Zayit Abecedary in Context, Eisenbrauns, 2008,

External links

Tel Zayit excavations
PBS video on Tel Zayit

Bronze Age sites in Israel
Populated places disestablished in the 9th century BC
1998 archaeological discoveries
Archaeological sites in Israel
Former populated places in Southwest Asia